The Last Stage (Polish: Ostatni etap) is a 1948 Polish feature film directed and co-written by Wanda Jakubowska, depicting her experiences in the Auschwitz concentration camp during World War II.

The film was one of the early cinematic efforts to describe the Holocaust, and it is still quoted extensively by succeeding directors, including Steven Spielberg in Schindler's List.

Plot
Marta Weiss (Barbara Drapinska), a Polish Jew, arrives by cattle car to the Auschwitz concentration camp. While there, she catches the attention of the guards as she is multilingual and is put to work as a translator. When she inquires about the factory at the camp, a fellow inmate informs her that it is a crematorium and that the rest of her family likely has been murdered. The character Marta Weiss is based on the true life of Mala Zimetbaum.

In the barracks, many of the women are dying and ill. Eugenia, a prisoner and doctor, tries her best to minister to them but is unable to do much as supplies are limited. The women learn that an international commission is coming to the camp to observe the conditions of the prisoners. Eugenia learns a few key phrases in German and is able to tell the observers that everything they see is a lie and people are dying. Unfortunately the commanders tell the observers that Eugenia is mentally ill. Later they torture her to find out who taught her the German phrases but Eugenia refuses to tell them and is murdered.

Eugenia is replaced by Lalunia, a Polish woman who claims to have been rounded up by mistake and who says she is a doctor though she is actually only a pharmacist's wife. However rather than administer medicine to the women of the camp she distributes them among the Kapos in exchange for luxuries like clothes and perfume. The nurses' aide searches her room and confiscates the remaining medicine. Lalunia later turns the aide in and has her killed after discovering messages she had written that the Russians were advancing.

Meanwhile, Marta is able to temporarily escape in order to smuggle information about the camps to a resistance broadcaster. When she is returned to the camp, she is tortured and then sentenced to death by hanging. A prisoner frees her wrists and hands her a knife before she is to die, and she tells the camp that the Russians are coming and slashes the face of the Nazi commander who tortured her. Before the guards can retaliate, planes are heard overhead, and Marta realizes that the Russians have come to liberate them.

Cast
 Barbara Drapinska
 Wanda Bartówna
 Alina Janowska
 Maria Vinogradova

Release and reception
The film won the Crystal Globe at Karlovy Vary International Film Festival in 1948, and it was nominated for Grand International Award at Venice Film Festival in 1948 and for a BAFTA Award for Best Film from Any Source in 1950.

It was released in the U.S. with English subtitles by Times Film Corporation in 1949 as The Last Stop.

It was released on DVD in the U.S. in 2009 by Polart Distribution.

References

External links

1947 films
1947 drama films
Polish drama films
1940s Polish-language films
1940s German-language films
Holocaust films
Films based on actual events
Films directed by Wanda Jakubowska
Crystal Globe winners
Polish black-and-white films
1940s multilingual films
Polish multilingual films